Scott L. Miller (born 1966) is an American composer best known for his electroacoustic chamber music and ecosystemic performance pieces.

Career
Miller's music is characterized by collaborative approaches to composition and the use of electronics, performer-computer improvisation and re-imagining ancient composing processes through the lens of 21st-century technology. Inspired by the inner-workings of sound and the microscopic in the natural and mechanical worlds, his music is the product of experimentation and collaboration with musicians and performers from across the spectrum of styles.

His recent work experiments with virtual reality (VR) applications in live concerts, was first realized in his composition Raba, created for Tallinn, Estonia-based Ensemble U:.

Miller’s ecosystemic works model the behavior of objects from the natural world in electronic sound, creating interactive sonic ecosystems. Ecosystemic pieces are the result of autonomous sounds competing with each other for sonic space.

Recordings of his music are available on New Focus Recordings, Innova, and other labels, many featuring his long-time collaborators, the new music ensemble Zeitgeist. His music is published by the American Composers Alliance, Tetractys, and Jeanné. Raba (NFR198) is his most recent album, a collection of audio-visual music drawn from collaborations with six film and video artists.

Miller is a Professor of Music at St. Cloud State University, Minnesota, where he teaches composition, electroacoustic music and theory. He is Past-President (2014—18) of the Society for Electro-Acoustic Music in the U.S. (SEAMUS) and presently Director of SEAMUS Records. He holds degrees from The University of Minnesota, The University of North Carolina - Chapel Hill and the State University of New York at Oneonta, and studied composition at the Czech-American Summer Music Institute and the Centre de Création Musicale Iannis Xenakis.

Miller has been named a McKnight Composer Fellow three times (2001, 2013, 2018), a Fulbright Scholar (2014—15), and his work has been recognized by numerous state, national, and international arts organizations, and reviewed and covered by journals including Computer Music Journal (MIT Press), New Music Box, I Care if You Listen, and others.  He has been the featured artist at several festivals, including the Chicago Electro-Acoustic Music Festival (April 2019), the Lipa Festival (2017), and the Estonian Academy of Music’s Autumn Festival, Sügisfest 2016.

Discography as composer, performer

 Raba, featuring Laura Cocks, Dan Lippel, and Ensemble U:. New Focus Recordings FCR198. 
 Travelogue, featuring Three Free Radicals (Scott Miller and Mart Soo). Improtest IMPR11. 
 bc+1[track_number++] = (laptop) scott_miller + bc; featuring Binary Canary (Kyle Hutchins and Ted Moore). Avid Records 20171. 
 Every Problem is a Nail, recorded on The Electro-Acoustic Piano, Vol. 2, featuring Keith Kirchoff. Thinking Outloud. 
 Pure Pleasure, recorded on EOS, featuring Patti Cudd. Innova 967. 
 Avec Scott, recorded on Avec, featuring Émilie Girard-Charest. Kohlenstoff. 
 Diary of a Left-Handed Sleepwalker, featuring Three Free Radicals (Scott Miller and Mart Soo). Panoramic PAN04. 
 Tipping Point, featuring Zeitgeist and Carrie Henneman Shaw. New Focus Recordings FCR161.
 Contents May Differ, recorded on Music from SEAMUS vol. 24, featuring Pat O’Keefe. EAAM-2014. 
 Contents May Differ, recorded on Contents May Differ, featuring Pat O’Keefe. Innova 888. 
 Devices & Desires, Carla Rees and Scott Miller. rarescale rr004. 
 Tipping Point, recorded on Music from SEAMUS vol. 20, featuring Zeitgeist. EAAM-2011. 
 And Thirty More, recorded on Here and Now, featuring Zeitgeist. Innova 799. 
 Willful Devices, featuring Pat O’Keefe and Scott Miller. 
 Shape Shifting: Shades of Transformation, recorded on Shape Shifting, Innova 638, featuring Zeitgeist and Felip Costaglioli. 
 Elegy, recorded on Trio Montecino, Eroica JDT3196, featuring David Shea, clarinet; Pablo Mahave-Veglia, violoncello; Paulina Zamora, piano. 
 Time is Vicious (if you take it for granted), recorded on WIZARDS!, CRS 9460, by The Double Reed Ensemble of Iowa.

Selected works

2018
 Katabasis 
Four instruments; duration: 20 minutes. First performance: 2 November 2018, Strains, at Studio Z, St. Paul, MN.

 Sonic Augmented Reality (SonAR) Study I: St. Cloud State University
Smartphone, SonAR Study I app, headphones; duration: 13 minutes. Created with assistance from the St. Cloud State University Visualization and Simulation Lab. First performance: 5 September 2018, SCSU, St. Cloud, MN.

 This Strange Fine-Tuning of Our Universe II
Two or more instruments and interactive-electronic (Kyma), two cardioid microphones, and multi-channel diffusion of sound; duration: 14 minutes. Written for Camilla Hoitenga and Taavi Kerikmäe. First performance: 16 February 2018, Studio Z, St. Paul, MN.

2017
 Raba - VR version for Ensemble U  
Alto flute, clarinet, violin, cello, piano, tam-tam, fixed-media electronics and 360º VR film; duration: 11 minutes. Film by Rein Zobel. First performance: 29 December 2017, Ensemble U:, Estonian Academy of Music and Theatre, Tallinn. 
 
 Hilltop at Montalvo
Fixed-media electronics and video; duration: 9 minutes. Video by Paul Clipson. First performance: 17 May 2017, Spectrum NYC. 
 
 Admiration
Electric guitar, fixed-media electronics and video; duration: 10 minutes. Video by Rosemary Williams. Reconstruction and revision from The Cosmic Engine (2008). First performance: 17 May 2017, Daniel Lippel, SpectrumNYC.

2016

 Solstice Orrery
Fixed-media or interactive electronics and video; duration: 10 minutes. Video by Ted Moore. First performance: 7 October 2016, Sügisfest, Estonian Academy of Music and Theatre, Tallinn.

 Islands
Flute and interactive-electronics (Kyma), two cardioid microphones, and multi-channel diffusion of sound; duration: 10 – 50 minutes. First performance: 7 September 2016, Carla Rees, PACE-1, De Montfort University, Leiceister, UK.

 Meditation
Guitar and fixed-media electronics; duration: 10 minutes. Commissioned by Dan Lippel. First performance: 15 January 2016, Daniel Lippel, St. Cloud State University, St. Cloud, MN.

2015

 Balancing Act	
Soprano/Tenor saxophone, clarinet/bass clarinet, guitar, real-time electronics, interactive-electronics (Kyma), multiple cardioid microphones, and multi-channel diffusion of sound; duration: 2 hours 45 minutes. Commissioned by Hinge Arts for the Kirkbride. First performance: 7 December 2015, Fifth Column, Zachmann Gallery, Fergus Falls, MN.

 Accretion	
Flute, clarinet/bass clarinet, violin, cello, piano, multi-percussion, and fixed-media electronics; duration: 9 minutes. Commissioned by Ensemble U:. First performance: 3 November 2015, Ensemble U:, St. Cloud State University, St. Cloud, MN.

 Returning to Unknown Worlds	
Saxophone, interactive-electronics, two cardioid microphones, and four-channel diffusion of sound, and video; duration: 10 minutes. Created in collaboration with Michael Monhart and Scott Weissinger. First performance: 11 August 2015, Kyma International Sound Symposium, Bozeman, MT.

 Rubber Band, Man	
Marimba and fixed-media electronics; duration: 7 minutes. Commissioned by Heather Barringer. First performance: 12 June 2015, Heather Barringer, Studio Z, St. Paul, MN.

 Raba	
Alto flute, violin, cello, tam-tam, and fixed-media electronics; duration: 11 minutes. Commissioned by Spitting Image Collective. First performance: 2 May 2015, Strains, Studio Z, St. Paul, MN.

2014

 Avec Scott (a.k.a. Whispering Beast X Émilie)	
Cello, interactive-electronics, two cardioid microphones, and four-channel diffusion of sound; duration: 10’. Created in collaboration with Émilie Girard-Charest. First performance: 14 December 2014, Estonian Academy of Music and Theater, Tallinn, Estonia.

 A Lovely Gesture	
Interactive-electronics and ensemble; duration: 10’. Created in collaboration with Anne La Berge. First performance: 28 September 2014, Lübeck, Germany.

 Electro-organic Ecosystem for Lübeck	
Organ and interactive-electronics; duration: 10’. First performance: 26 September 2014, Alex Annegorn, St. Jakobi Church, Lübeck, Germany.

 Every Problem is a Nail
Piano and fixed-media electronics; duration: 10 minutes. Commissioned by Keith Kirchoff. First performance: 7 June 2014, Keith Kirchoff, New York City Electronic Music Festival.

2013

 This Strange Fine-Tuning of Our Universe	
¼-tone flute and interactive-electronics; duration: 10 – 15 minutes. Written for Anne La Berge. First performance: 13 September 2013, Anne La Berge, Espace Senghor, Brussels.

 Consortia	
Interactive-electronics and ensemble; duration: 12 minutes. First performance: 17–19 May 2013, Zeitgeist, St. Paul, MN. 
 
 Contents May Differ	
Bass clarinet and electronics; duration: 9 minutes. Commissioned by Pat O’Keefe. First performance: 15 March 2013, Pat O’Keefe, St. Paul, MN.

 No. 6	
Structured improvisation for interactive-electronics and ensemble; duration: 10 minutes. First performance: 2 October 2013, Fifth Column, St. Cloud, MN.

 ORCH a	
Structured improvisation for interactive-electronics and ensemble; duration: 18 minutes. First performance: 2 October 2013, Fifth Column, St. Cloud, MN.

 Two Steps Forward	
Structured improvisation for interactive-electronics and ensemble; duration: 8 minutes. First performance: 2 October 2013, Fifth Column, St. Cloud, MN.

 The Frost Performs its Secret Ministry (revised 2016)	
Flute, guitar, and electronics; duration: 6.5 minutes. Commissioned by Jesse Langen and Linda Chatterton. First performance: 6 February 2013, St. Cloud State University.

2012

 Proof of Concept	
Trumpet, violin, viola, interactive-electronics; duration: 1 minute. First performance: 1–11 October 2012, SoundProof Fall 2012 concert tour, Bowling Green State University; College-Conservatory of Music, University of Cincinnati; Ohio University; Electronic Music Midwest 2012.

 Détente	
EMMI robots (AMI, CARI, TAPI), interactive-electronics, two cardioid microphones; duration: 10 – 30 minutes. First performance: 14 July 2012, Sound and Music Computing Conference, Copenhagen, Denmark.

2011

 Anterior/Interior 
¼-tone alto flute and interactive-electronics; 8’. First performance: 23 November 2011 by Carla Rees, on rarescale concert (re)introduction, Shoreditch Church, London, UK. Published by Tetractys.

 Forth and Back 	
Soprano, bass clarinet, marimba, vibes, multi-percussion and piano, setting of Felip Costaglioli’s poem; duration: 20 minutes. First performance: 6–8 October 2011, on Zeitgeist’s concert series Fall Music Harvest, Studio Z, St. Paul, MN.

 Orrery for Casa da Música 	
Interactive-electronics, two cardioid microphones, and four-channel diffusion of sound; duration: 10 – 15 minutes. First performance: 18 September 2011, Kyma International Sound Symposium 2011, Porto, Portugal.

2010

 Whispering Beast 	
Interactive-electronics, two cardioid microphones, and four-channel diffusion of sound; duration: 6.5 minutes. First performance: 24 September 2010, Kyma International Sound Symposium 2010, Vienna, Austria.

 Tipping Point 	
Bass clarinet, marimba, multi-percussion, piano and interactive-electronics; duration: 11.5 minutes. First performance: 1 – 3 April 2010 on Zeitgeist’s concert series Wired, Studio Z, St. Paul, MN. Official premier: 10 April 2010, SEAMUS 2010 National Conference, Saint Cloud, MN, by Zeitgeist. 
2009

 Chimeric Night 	
Clarinet and interactive-electronics; duration: 5.5 minutes. First performance: 20 October 2009, Hewitt Pantaleoni Concert Series, Oneonta, NY, Calvin Falwell, cl. 
	
 haiku, interrupted 	
Clarinet and interactive-electronics; duration: 7.5 minutes. Created in collaboration with Pat O’Keefe. First performance: 17 February 2009 at Spark Festival of Electronic Music and Art, University of Minnesota Arts Quarter, Pat O’Keefe, cl.

 Lovely Little Monster 	
Flute, clarinet, percussion and interactive or fixed-media electronics (CD); duration: 7 minutes. First performance: 20 February 2009 at Spark Festival of Electronic Music and Art, University of Minnesota Arts Quarter, Jenny Hanson, fl, Pat O’Keefe, cl., Patti Cudd, perc. Solo cl. version first performed 17 April 2009 at SEAMUS 2009 National Conference, Fort Wayne, IN, Marianne Gythfeldt, cl.

2008

Nebe Na Zemi (Heaven on Earth)	
Soprano, interactive-electronics performance environment for Kyma, two cardioid microphones, and four-channel diffusion of sound; duration: 32 minutes. Created for visual artist Vladimír Havlík's multi-channel video installation in the Corpus Christi chapel, Olomouc, CZ. Setting of text from Karl Marx's Das Kapital. First performance: 5 November 2008, Marketa Večeřova, sop.

 And 30 More 	
Bass clarinet, piano, two percussionists and fixed-media electronics (CD); duration: 2.5 minutes. Commissioned by Zeitgeist. First performance: 20–22 June 2008 by Zeitgeist, Studio Z, St. Paul, MN.

 Pure Pleasure 	
Two Snare Drums and fixed-media electronics (CD); duration: 5 minutes. Commissioned by Patti Cudd. First performance: 7 March 2008 by Patti Cudd, Studio Z, St. Paul, MN.

 The Cosmic Engine 	
Soprano, clarinet/bass clarinet, acoustic/electric guitar, cello, four channel interactive and fixed-media electronics, three channels of video projection; duration: 65 minutes. Created in collaboration with Rosemary Williams (video artist) and Pat O'Keefe (woodwinds). Commissioned by The Southern Theater. First performance: 30–31 May 2008 by Scott Miller, Rosemary Williams, Pat O'Keefe, Norah Long, Jeff Lambert, and Jacqueline Ultan, Electric Eyes New Music and Media Festival, The Southern Theater, Minneapolis, MN.

2006

 Three Gestures 	
Clarinet, cello, and piano; duration: 10 minutes. Commissioned by Trio Montecino. First performance: 8 October 2006 by Trio Montecino, Gant Recital Hall, St. Cloud, MN.

 Some Fabric and a Few Pieces of Bone 	
Interactive work for Kyma, two cardioid microphones, and four-channel diffusion of sound; duration: 6.5 minutes. First performance: September 2006, Livewire Electronic Music Concert, University of Minnesota, Minneapolis, MN.

 Chimera No. 2 	
Violin and fixed-media electronics (CD); duration: 19 minutes. Commissioned by Mlade Podium Festival for premier by violinist Iva Kramperová. First performance: 12 September 2006 by Iva Kramperová, Mlade Podium Festival, Pardubice, CZ.

 Fun House 	
Bass Clarinet and Interactive Electronics, 2 cardioid microphones, and 4 channel diffusion of sound; duration: 12 – 20 minutes. Commissioned by and created in collaboration with Pat O'Keefe. First performance: February 2006, by Pat O'Keefe, Spark Festival of Electronic Music and Art, Ted Mann Hall, University of Minnesota, Minneapolis, MN.

2005

 Engines of... 	
String Orchestra and fixed-media; duration: 7 minutes. Commissioned by Maple Grove Senior High School Orchestra with support of the Maple Grove Music Boosters. First performance: 30 January 2006, by the Maple Grove Senior High School Orchestra, Matt Caron, conductor, Maple Grove, MN.

2004

 Shape Shifting: Shades of Transformation 	
Commissioned by Zeitgeist. Includes the works: Apnèe, Mirror Inside, St. Victoire, Desire Also Has Its Own Geography, Dressing Up, Jardins Mécaniques, Digging Space, Les Cançóns de la Sang, New Snow. Spoken-word, Interactive-Electronics, Alto Sax/Bass Clarinet, Piano, Percussion (2); includes settings of Philippe Costaglioli's "Apnèe," "St. Victoire," and "Dressing Up;" duration: 65 – 70 minutes. Created in collaboration with Zeitgeist and Philippe Costaglioli. Underwritten by the American Composers Forum with funds provided by the Jerome Foundation. Made possible with support from the Zeitgeist Commissioning Collective. First performance: 4–12 June 2004 by Philippe Costaglioli, Scott Miller, and Zeitgeist at Studio Z, St. Paul, MN.

2001

 Ecce Dominus Veniet
Women's Choir (SA) and Percussion; duration: 6 minutes. Composed with support from the Minnesota State Arts Board Artist Assistance Fellowship, Fiscal Year 2001 and supported in part by the American Composers Forum through the 2001 McKnight Composer Fellowship Program. First performance: 5 December 2001 by the SCSU Women's Choir and the SCSU Percussion Collective, Ritsche Auditorium, St. Cloud, MN.

 Landscape	
Created with support from St. Cloud State University Scholarly and Creative Activity Reassign Time. Wind Ensemble and Fixed-media; duration: 8 minutes. First performance: 22 April 2001 by the SCSU Wind Ensemble at St. Mary's Cathedral, St. Cloud, MN.

2000

 Chimera	
Viola and Fixed-media; duration: 7 minutes. First performance: 27 March 2000 by Coca Bochonko, Ruth Gant Recital Hall, St. Cloud, MN. 
1998

 Autumn Etude (a.k.a. In Memorium Lloyd Ultan)	
Fixed-media; duration: 8 minutes. First performance: 12 November 1998 at Sonic Circuits VI, St. Cloud, MN.

 Dies Sanctificatus	
Mixed Choir and fixed-media; duration: 7 minutes. First performance: 17 April 1998 by the SCSU Concert Choir, Jeffrey Douma, cdtr., Ritsche Auditorium, St. Cloud, MN.

1992

 Time is Vicious (if you take it for granted) 
Commissioned by The Double Reed Ensemble of Iowa (a.k.a. Wizards). Two oboes, english horn & bassoon; duration: 5 minutes. Published by Jeanné, Inc. Recorded on the Wizards' CRS Master Recordings CD (CRS 9460). First performance: 1993 by The Double Reed Ensemble of Iowa, University of Iowa, Iowa City, IA.

References

Living people
1966 births
21st-century American composers